Howard William "Swan" Johnson (January 1, 1908 – December 28, 1991) was an American swing alto saxophonist.

In New York City Johnson was a member of bands led by Billy Cato, James P. Johnson, and Fess Williams. In the 1930s he worked with Benny Carter and Teddy Hill, followed in the 1940s by Claude Hopkins and Maxine Sullivan. From 1946 to 1948 he was in Dizzy Gillespie's band. He recorded with Gillespie and with Red Norvo and Bessie Smith. He also worked with the Harlem Blues and Jazz Band led by Clyde Bernhardt and the Savoy Sultans led by Panama Francis. Born in 1908, he continued to work through the 1980s. He should not be confused with tuba player Howard Johnson.

References

1908 births
1991 deaths
20th-century American saxophonists
American jazz saxophonists
Savoy Sultans members
Harlem Blues and Jazz Band members